In mathematics, a Lie algebra (pronounced  ) is a vector space  together with an operation called the Lie bracket, an alternating bilinear map , that satisfies the Jacobi identity. The vector space  together with this operation is a non-associative algebra, meaning that the Lie bracket is not necessarily associative. 

Lie algebras are closely related to Lie groups, which are groups that are also smooth manifolds: any Lie group gives rise to a Lie algebra, which is its tangent space at the identity. Conversely, to any finite-dimensional Lie algebra over real or complex numbers, there is a corresponding connected Lie group unique up to finite coverings (Lie's third theorem). This correspondence allows one to study the structure and classification of Lie groups in terms of Lie algebras.

In physics, Lie groups appear as symmetry groups of physical systems, and their Lie algebras (tangent vectors near the identity) may be thought of as infinitesimal symmetry motions. Thus Lie algebras and their representations are used extensively in physics, notably in quantum mechanics and particle physics.

An elementary example is the space of three dimensional vectors  with the bracket operation defined by the cross product  This is skew-symmetric since , and instead of associativity it satisfies the Jacobi identity:

The Lie bracket is a measure of the non-commutativity between two rotations: since a rotation commutes with itself, we have the alternating property .

History 
Lie algebras were introduced to study the concept of infinitesimal transformations by Marius Sophus Lie in the 1870s, and independently discovered by Wilhelm Killing in the 1880s. The name Lie algebra was given by Hermann Weyl in the 1930s; in older texts, the term infinitesimal group is used.

Definitions

Definition of a Lie algebra
A Lie algebra is a vector space  over some field  together with a binary operation  called the Lie bracket satisfying the following axioms:

 Bilinearity,

 Alternativity,

 The Jacobi identity,
 

 Anticommutativity,
  
If the field's characteristic is not 2 then anticommutativity implies alternativity, since it implies 

Generators and dimension
Elements of a Lie algebra  are said to generate it if the smallest subalgebra containing these elements is  itself. The cardinality of a minimal generating set of a Lie algebra is always less than or equal to its dimension.

See the classification of low-dimensional real Lie algebras for other small examples.

Subalgebras, ideals and homomorphisms 
The Lie bracket is not required to be associative, meaning that  need not equal . However, it is flexible. Nonetheless, much of the terminology of associative rings and algebras is commonly applied to Lie algebras. A Lie subalgebra  is a subspace  which is closed under the Lie bracket.  An ideal  is a subalgebra satisfying the stronger condition:

A Lie algebra homomorphism is a linear map compatible with the respective Lie brackets:

As for associative rings, ideals are precisely the kernels of homomorphisms; given a Lie algebra  and an ideal  in it, one constructs the factor algebra or quotient algebra , and the first isomorphism theorem holds for Lie algebras.

Since the Lie bracket is a kind of infinitesimal commutator of the corresponding Lie group, we say that two elements  commute if their bracket vanishes: . 

The centralizer subalgebra of a subset  is the set of elements commuting with : that is, . The centralizer of  itself is the center  .

Examples 
For , the commutator of two elements  and :shows  is a subalgebra, but not an ideal. In fact, every one-dimensional linear subspace of a Lie algebra has an induced abelian Lie algebra structure, which is generally not an ideal. For any simple Lie algebra, all abelian Lie algebras can never be ideals.

Direct sum and semidirect product 

so that the copies of  commute with each other:  

See also semidirect sum of Lie algebras.

Levi's theorem says that a finite-dimensional Lie algebra is a semidirect product of its radical and the complementary subalgebra (Levi subalgebra).

Derivations 
A derivation on the Lie algebra  (or on any non-associative algebra) is a linear map  that obeys the Leibniz law, that is,

for all . (This is a derivation as a consequence of the Jacobi identity.) The outer derivations are derivations which do not come from the adjoint representation of the Lie algebra. If  is semisimple, every derivation is inner.

Examples 

Split Lie algebra 
Let V be a finite-dimensional vector space over a field F,  the Lie algebra of linear transformations and  a Lie subalgebra. A split real form of a complex semisimple Lie algebra (cf. #Real form and complexification) is an example of a split real Lie algebra. See also split Lie algebra for further information.

Vector space basis 
For practical calculations, it is often convenient to choose an explicit vector space basis for the algebra.  A common construction for this basis is sketched in the article structure constants.

Definition using category-theoretic notation

Although the definitions above are sufficient for a conventional understanding of Lie algebras, once this is understood, additional insight can be gained by using notation common to category theory, that is, by defining a Lie algebra in terms of linear maps—that is, morphisms of the category of vector spaces—without considering individual elements. (In this section, the field over which the algebra is defined is supposed to be of characteristic different from two.) 

For the category-theoretic definition of Lie algebras, two braiding isomorphisms are needed. If  is a vector space, the interchange isomorphism  is defined by 

The cyclic-permutation braiding  is defined as

where  is the identity morphism.
Equivalently,  is defined by

With this notation, a Lie algebra can be defined as an object  in the category of vector spaces together with a morphism 
 
that satisfies the two morphism equalities

and

Examples

Vector spaces 

Any vector space  endowed with the identically zero Lie bracket becomes a Lie algebra. Such Lie algebras are called abelian, cf. below. Any one-dimensional Lie algebra over a field is abelian, by the alternating property of the Lie bracket.

Associative algebra with commutator bracket 
 On an associative algebra  over a field  with multiplication , a Lie bracket may be defined by the commutator . With this bracket,  is a Lie algebra.  The associative algebra A is called an enveloping algebra of the Lie algebra . Every Lie algebra can be embedded into one that arises from an associative algebra in this fashion; see universal enveloping algebra.
 The associative algebra of the endomorphisms of an F-vector space  with the above Lie bracket is denoted .
This is the Lie algebra of the general linear group, consisting of invertible matrices.

Special matrices 

 The matrices of trace zero form the special linear Lie algebra , the Lie algebra of the special linear group .
The skew-hermitian matrices form the unitary Lie algebra , the Lie algebra of the unitary group U(n).

Matrix Lie algebras 

A complex matrix group is a Lie group consisting of matrices, where the multiplication of G is matrix multiplication.
The following are examples of Lie algebras of matrix Lie groups:

 The special linear group , consisting of all  matrices with determinant 1. Its Lie algebra consists of all  matrices with complex entries and trace 0. Similarly, one can define the corresponding real Lie group  and its Lie algebra .
 The unitary group  consists of n × n unitary matrices (satisfying ). Its Lie algebra  consists of skew-self-adjoint matrices.
 The special orthogonal group , consisting of real determinant-one orthogonal matrices. Its Lie algebra  consists of real skew-symmetric matrices. See also infinitesimal rotations with skew-symmetric matrices. Similarly, one can define a complex version of this group and algebra, simply by allowing complex matrix entries.

Two dimensions 

 On any field  there is, up to isomorphism, a single two-dimensional nonabelian Lie algebra. It generates the affine group in one dimension.

This can be realized by the matrices: 

Since

for any natural number  and any , one sees that the resulting Lie group elements are upper triangular 2×2 matrices with unit lower diagonal:

Three dimensions 

.
It is usually realized as the space of 3×3 strictly upper-triangular matrices, with the commutator Lie bracket and the basis

Any element of the Heisenberg group has a representation as a product of group generators, i.e., matrix exponentials of these Lie algebra generators, 

 The Lie algebra  of the group SO(3) is spanned by the three matrices

The commutation relations among these generators are

 
 

This Lie algebra is unitarily equivalent to the usual Spin (physics) angular-momentum component operators for spin-1 particles in quantum mechanics.

Infinite dimensions 

 An important class of infinite-dimensional real Lie algebras arises in differential topology. The space of smooth vector fields on a differentiable manifold M forms a Lie algebra, where the Lie bracket is defined to be the commutator of vector fields. One way of expressing the Lie bracket is through the formalism of Lie derivatives, which identifies a vector field X with a first order partial differential operator LX acting on smooth functions by letting LX(f) be the directional derivative of the function f in the direction of X. The Lie bracket [X,Y] of two vector fields is the vector field defined through its action on functions by the formula:
 	
 

Kac–Moody algebras are a large class of infinite-dimensional Lie algebras whose structure is very similar to the finite-dimensional cases above.
 The Moyal algebra is an infinite-dimensional Lie algebra that contains all classical Lie algebras as subalgebras.
 The Virasoro algebra is of paramount importance in string theory.

Representations

Definitions
A representation of a Lie algebra  on V is a Lie algebra homomorphism

A representation is said to be faithful if its kernel is zero. Ado's theorem states that every finite-dimensional Lie algebra has a faithful representation on a finite-dimensional vector space.

Adjoint representation
For any Lie algebra , we can define a representation

Goals of representation theory
One important aspect of the study of Lie algebras (especially semisimple Lie algebras) is the study of their representations. (Indeed, most of the books listed in the references section devote a substantial fraction of their pages to representation theory.) Although Ado's theorem is an important result, the primary goal of representation theory is not to find a faithful representation of a given Lie algebra . Indeed, in the semisimple case, the adjoint representation is already faithful. In the semisimple case over a field of characteristic zero, Weyl's theorem says that every finite-dimensional representation is a direct sum of irreducible representations (those with no nontrivial invariant subspaces). The irreducible representations, in turn, are classified by a theorem of the highest weight.

Representation theory in physics
The representation theory of Lie algebras plays an important role in various parts of theoretical physics. There, one considers operators on the space of states that satisfy certain natural commutation relations. These commutation relations typically come from a symmetry of the problem—specifically, they are the relations of the Lie algebra of the relevant symmetry group. An example would be the angular momentum operators, whose commutation relations are those of the Lie algebra  of the rotation group SO(3). Typically, the space of states is very far from being irreducible under the pertinent operators, but one can attempt to decompose it into irreducible pieces. In doing so, one needs to know the irreducible representations of the given Lie algebra. In the study of the quantum hydrogen atom, for example, quantum mechanics textbooks give (without calling it that) a classification of the irreducible representations of the Lie algebra .

Structure theory and classification 

Lie algebras can be classified to some extent. In particular, this has an application to the classification of Lie groups.

Abelian, nilpotent, and solvable 
Analogously to abelian, nilpotent, and solvable groups, defined in terms of the derived subgroups, one can define abelian, nilpotent, and solvable Lie algebras.

Abelian Lie algebras correspond to commutative (or abelian) connected Lie groups such as vector spaces  or tori , and are all of the form  meaning an n-dimensional vector space with the trivial Lie bracket.

A more general class of Lie algebras is defined by the vanishing of all commutators of given length. A Lie algebra  is nilpotent if the lower central series

becomes zero eventually. By Engel's theorem, a Lie algebra is nilpotent if and only if for every u in  the adjoint endomorphism

is nilpotent.

More generally still, a Lie algebra  is said to be solvable if the derived series:

becomes zero eventually.

Every finite-dimensional Lie algebra has a unique maximal solvable ideal, called its radical. Under the Lie correspondence, nilpotent (respectively, solvable) connected Lie groups correspond to nilpotent (respectively, solvable) Lie algebras.

Simple and semisimple 

A Lie algebra is "simple" if it has no non-trivial ideals and is not abelian. (This implies that a one-dimensional—necessarily abelian—Lie algebra is by definition not simple, even though it has no nontrivial ideals.) A Lie algebra  is called semisimple if it is isomorphic to a direct sum of simple algebras. There are several equivalent characterizations of semisimple algebras, such as having no nonzero solvable ideals.

The concept of semisimplicity for Lie algebras is closely related with the complete reducibility (semisimplicity) of their representations. When the ground field F has characteristic zero, any finite-dimensional representation of a semisimple Lie algebra is semisimple (i.e., direct sum of irreducible representations). In general, a Lie algebra is called reductive if the adjoint representation is semisimple. Thus, a semisimple Lie algebra is reductive.

Cartan's criterion 

Cartan's criterion gives conditions for a Lie algebra to be nilpotent, solvable, or semisimple. It is based on the notion of the Killing form, a symmetric bilinear form on  defined by the formula
 
where tr denotes the trace of a linear operator. A Lie algebra  is semisimple if and only if the Killing form is nondegenerate. A Lie algebra  is solvable if and only if

Classification 

The Levi decomposition expresses an arbitrary Lie algebra as a semidirect sum of its solvable radical and a semisimple Lie algebra, almost in a canonical way. (Such a decomposition exists for a finite-dimensional Lie algebra over a field of characteristic zero.) Furthermore, semisimple Lie algebras over an algebraically closed field have been completely classified through their root systems.

Relation to Lie groups 

Although Lie algebras are often studied in their own right, historically they arose as a means to study Lie groups.

We now briefly outline the relationship between Lie groups and Lie algebras. Any Lie group gives rise to a canonically determined Lie algebra (concretely, the tangent space at the identity). Conversely, for any finite-dimensional Lie algebra , there exists a corresponding connected Lie group  with Lie algebra . This is Lie's third theorem; see the Baker–Campbell–Hausdorff formula. This Lie group is not determined uniquely; however, any two Lie groups with the same Lie algebra are locally isomorphic, and in particular, have the same universal cover.

If we consider simply connected Lie groups, however, we have a one-to-one correspondence: For each (finite-dimensional real) Lie algebra , there is a unique simply connected Lie group  with Lie algebra .

The correspondence between Lie algebras and Lie groups is used in several ways, including in the classification of Lie groups and the related matter of the representation theory of Lie groups.  Every representation of a Lie algebra lifts uniquely to a representation of the corresponding connected, simply connected Lie group, and conversely every representation of any Lie group induces a representation of the group's Lie algebra; the representations are in one-to-one correspondence.  Therefore, knowing the representations of a Lie algebra settles the question of representations of the group.

As for classification, it can be shown that any connected Lie group with a given Lie algebra is isomorphic to the universal cover mod a discrete central subgroup.  So classifying Lie groups becomes simply a matter of counting the discrete subgroups of the center, once the classification of Lie algebras is known (solved by Cartan et al. in the semisimple case).

If the Lie algebra is infinite-dimensional, the issue is more subtle.  In many instances, the exponential map is not even locally a homeomorphism (for example, in Diff(S1), one may find diffeomorphisms arbitrarily close to the identity that are not in the image of exp).  Furthermore, some infinite-dimensional Lie algebras are not the Lie algebra of any group.

Real form and complexification 

Given a semisimple finite-dimensional complex Lie algebra , a split form of it is a real form that splits; i.e., it has a Cartan subalgebra which acts via an adjoint representation with real eigenvalues. A split form exists and is unique (up to isomorphisms). A compact form is a real form that is the Lie algebra of a compact Lie group. A compact form exists and is also unique.

Lie algebra with additional structures 
A Lie algebra can be equipped with some additional structures that are assumed to be compatible with the bracket. For example, a graded Lie algebra is a Lie algebra with a graded vector space structure. If it also comes with differential (so that the underlying graded vector space is a chain complex), then it is called a differential graded Lie algebra.

A simplicial Lie algebra is a simplicial object in the category of Lie algebras; in other words, it is obtained by replacing the underlying set with a simplicial set (so it might be better thought of as a family of Lie algebras).

Lie ring 
A Lie ring arises as a generalisation of Lie algebras, or through the study of the lower central series of groups. A Lie ring is defined as a nonassociative ring with multiplication that is anticommutative and satisfies the Jacobi identity. More specifically we can define a Lie ring  to be an abelian group with an operation  that has the following properties:

 Bilinearity:

for all x, y, z ∈ L.

 The Jacobi identity:

 

for all x, y, z in L.

 For all x in L:

Lie rings need not be Lie groups under addition.  Any Lie algebra is an example of a Lie ring.  Any associative ring can be made into a Lie ring by defining a bracket operator .  Conversely to any Lie algebra there is a corresponding ring, called the universal enveloping algebra.

Lie rings are used in the study of finite p-groups through the Lazard correspondence.  The lower central factors of a p-group are finite abelian p-groups, so modules over Z/pZ.  The direct sum of the lower central factors is given the structure of a Lie ring by defining the bracket to be the commutator of two coset representatives.  The Lie ring structure is enriched with another module homomorphism, the pth power map, making the associated Lie ring a so-called restricted Lie ring.

Lie rings are also useful in the definition of a p-adic analytic groups and their endomorphisms by studying Lie algebras over rings of integers such as the p-adic integers.  The definition of finite groups of Lie type due to Chevalley involves restricting from a Lie algebra over the complex numbers to a Lie algebra over the integers, and then reducing modulo p to get a Lie algebra over a finite field.

Examples 
 Any Lie algebra over a general ring instead of a field is an example of a Lie ring.  Lie rings are not Lie groups under addition, despite the name.
 Any associative ring can be made into a Lie ring by defining a bracket operator
 
Then

 

is a Lie ring with addition supplied by the group operation (which is abelian in each homogeneous part), and the bracket operation given by

 

extended linearly. The centrality of the series ensures that the commutator  gives the bracket operation the appropriate Lie theoretic properties.

See also

 Adjoint representation of a Lie algebra
 Affine Lie algebra
 Anyonic Lie algebra
 Automorphism of a Lie algebra
 Chiral Lie algebra
 Free Lie algebra
 Index of a Lie algebra
 Lie algebra cohomology
 Lie algebra extension
 Lie algebra representation
 Lie bialgebra
 Lie coalgebra
 Lie operad
 Particle physics and representation theory
 Lie superalgebra
 Poisson algebra
 Pre-Lie algebra
 Quantum groups
 Moyal algebra
 Quasi-Frobenius Lie algebra
 Quasi-Lie algebra
 Restricted Lie algebra
 Serre relations
 Symmetric Lie algebra 
 Gelfand–Fuks cohomology

Remarks

References

Sources 
 
 
 
 Erdmann, Karin & Wildon, Mark. Introduction to Lie Algebras, 1st edition, Springer, 2006.

External links
 
 

Lie groups